Ville Tapani Tavio (born June 25, 1984 in Lappeenranta) is a Finnish politician and a member of the Parliament of Finland (MP). He is the chairperson of the Finns Party Parliamentary Group since April 2019.

Tavio joined the Finns Party in 2012. He was first elected to the Turku City Council in October 2012 and to the Parliament of Finland in April 2015.

Education
After upper secondary school graduation, Tavio enrolled in the University of Turku and received LL.M. degree in 2012. He has been an exchange student at the Prince of Songkla University in Thailand in 2010.

References

External links
 Ville Tavio – Ville Tavio's website 

1984 births
Living people
People from Lappeenranta
Finns Party politicians
Members of the Parliament of Finland (2015–19)
Members of the Parliament of Finland (2019–23)